Om 3D is a 2013 Indian Telugu-language action thriller film written and directed by Sunil Reddy. Touted to be the first Indian action film in 3D, the film stars Nandamuri Kalyan Ram, Karthik and Sampath Raj , along with Kriti Kharbanda and Nikesha Patel as the leading ladies. The film has been shot in 5k resolution. Hollywood technicians such as David Taylor, who worked for Avatar and Final Destination 5, and Ian Markus, known for films such as The Amazing Spiderman, have also worked for this film. The shooting was completed in 110 days, but the post production took another year. Music was composed by Achu Rajamani and Sai Karthik.

The film was theatrically released in 2D and 3D formats on 19 July 2013.

Plot
The film begins with the police investigating an accident scene, during which a girl arrives and learns that a man named Arjun's body has been damaged and his chances of survival are almost impossible. Arjun is shown to be alive and mourning the death of his loved one, following which he gets his head shaved and sets out to accomplish a mission.

A flashback begins, showing how Arjun managed to rescue his father Harischandra Prasad from the goons sent by a minister named Byreddy. In order to seek revenge, Byreddy gets a criminal named Bhavani released from prison. Arjun, in the meanwhile, meets a girl named Anjali, and they fall in love. One day, after dropping her at the railway station, Arjun is attacked by Bhavani and his goons but is rescued by his uncle Lakshman. At home, Harischandra reveals that Bhavani was an orphan adopted by his father, Vishnu Prasad, but he betrayed him by doing illegal weapon business, following which his father got him arrested. Bhavani killed his father, and Harischandra still got him punished by the law. In the meanwhile, Harischandra's brother Ajay's daughter Riya arrives, and her marriage is fixed with Arjun. However, on the day of Holi, when Arjun invites Anjali to meet his parents, and she leaves upon listening about his marriage, Ajay is killed by Bhavani's henchman. This prompts Arjun to fight off Byreddy's goons and make him arrange for a meeting with Bhavani. They meet at a railway crossing where Bhavani is found holding Anjali hostage, due to which Arjun is unable to shoot him. It is then revealed that Anjali had been sent undercover by Bhavani, realizing which shatters Arjun, who declares his love for her before his parents.

Back to the present, Arjun contacts Riya and tells her to meet him in the mountains outside the city, where he fights off goons and then proceeds to shoot Riya in the head. Learning that Arjun's not yet dead, Byreddy tries to escape along with his goons. A car chase ensues, at the end of which Arjun kills him. The flashback resumes, and an enraged Arjun searches for Anjali, only to find that her "relatives" have taken her away. In front of Bhavani, Anjali confesses her love for Arjun. Harischandra tells Riya to get closer to Arjun, and soon Lakshman is found to be embroiled in the illegal weapon business. Bhavani decides to tell Arjun that it was Harischandra who did the illegal weapon business. Anjali meets Arjun and apologizes, confessing her love for him. Arjun realizes her true emotions and convinces Harischandra of their marriage. It is then revealed that Lakshman had introduced Riya to trap Arjun. She gives a lift to Anjali and, after revealing her intentions, gets her injured in a car accident. Anjali is admitted to the hospital, and Byreddy tells Arjun that it was Bhavani who got her attacked. Lakshman and Harischandra convince Arjun to kill Bhavani, following which he attacks his goons but is knocked unconscious. A car chase ensues between Lakshman and Bhavani. Upon gaining consciousness, Arjun manages to crash the car on a bridge. He is rescued by Bhavani, who then reveals that he is his father and not Harischandra, who has lied to him about everything.

It is also revealed that Bhavani never tried to attack Arjun and didn't even tell Anjali that he's his son. Consumed by the thirst for wealth, Harischandra killed Vishnu Prasad and Arjun's mother but got Bhavani framed for his murder. In the meanwhile, Harischandra's wife becomes aware of his intentions as he explains his plan to Byreddy. Bhavani requests Arjun to address him as his father once before death, and he does the same before Bhavani runs towards Lakshman and his men with a bomb, causing everyone's death in an explosion. Arjun is rescued by Bhavani's brother Kaali who then reveals it to him that Vishnu Prasad's three sons: Harischandra, Ajay and Lakshman, were jealous of Bhavani, due to which they first framed and got him sent to jail, and in his absence, killed Vishnu Prasad and Arjun's mother. Bhavani, upon returning from jail, was forced to take the blame for their murders in order to save a young Arjun. He was sent to jail, and Harischandra raised Arjun as his own son. Realizing the truth, Arjun decides to seek revenge. Back to the present, Harischandra holds Kaali hostage at a warehouse, where Arjun arrives, and a shootout ensues, resulting in Harischandra's death.

Cast

 Nandamuri Kalyan Ram as Arjun
 Kriti Kharbanda as Anjali
 Nikesha Patel as Riya
 Karthik as Harischandra Prasad
 Rao Ramesh as Byrreddy
 Sampath Raj as Bhavani
 Sithara as Jyothi
 Suresh as Lakshman
 Ahuti Prasad as Ajay
 Raghu Karumanchi as Chandu
 Vijay Sai

Soundtrack
Achu and Sai Karthik Composed three and two songs, respectively, with Achu's work being praised. The audio was released by Mayuri Audio.

Reception
idlebrain Jeevi gave a rating of 3/5 stating, "one should pat the back of Kalyan Ram for making Om 3D film with uncompromising passion and first-class 3D technology!!".

References

External links

2013 films
2010s Telugu-language films
2013 action thriller films
Indian action thriller films
Indian nonlinear narrative films
2013 3D films
Indian 3D films
Films scored by Achu Rajamani
Indian films about revenge
Gun fu films
Films scored by Sai Karthik